Jazan University (commonly referred to as JazanU) is a public  research university based in the city of Jazan in Saudi Arabia . Founded in 2006, it is the province's only university and one of the largest public,  nonprofit institutions of higher education in the Kingdom of Saudi Arabia.  JazanU has a main central campus that rests by the Red Sea on the southwest coast of Saudi Arabia and also has satellite campuses in Sabya, Abu Arish, Farasan, Ad-darb, Samtah, Al-Daer and Al-Ardah.

JazanU offers a broad range of academic departments, an extensive research enterprise and a number of community outreach and public service programs. It is particularly well known for its medical school, dental school, school of business, its social sciences and humanities programs, as well as its biomedical teaching and research capabilities.

Academics 
University includes (23) faculties, including: (21) colleges granting bachelor's degree to male and female students, and one college granting diploma degree, and these colleges and scientific departments are:

 College of Applied Medical Sciences.
Faculty of Physical Therapy
 College of Health Sciences.
 College of Pharmacy.
 College of Dentistry.
 College of Medicine.
 College of Computer Sciences & Information Systems.
 College of Education.
 College of Engineering.
 College of Administrative Sciences.
 College of Languages.
 College of Science and Arts.
 College of Sharia.
 College of Science and Arts of Farasan.
 College of Science and Arts of Samtah.
 College of Science and Arts of Ad-darb.
College of Science and Arts of Al Dayer
 Community College.
 College of Business Administration

Former Rectors 
The following individuals have served as the rectors of the university since its inception:

References

External links 
 Official website
 Jazan University Press

2006 establishments in Saudi Arabia
Universities and colleges in Saudi Arabia
Educational institutions established in 2006